Aagos ang Dugo is a 2001 Philippine action drama film written and directed by Mauro Gia Samonte. The film stars Gardo Versoza, Isabel Granada, Derek Dee, Lovely Rivero, Kier Legaspi and Ricardo Cepeda.

The film is streaming online on YouTube.

Plot
Gino (Gardo) and Abet (Kier) are released from jail by Perlita (Isabel) for a job to kidnap a child (Christian) for ransom money. The two are unaware that it is planned by Perlita's estranged husband Martin (Ricardo), whose business has gone bankrupt. In the middle of the job, Gino and Perlita fall in love with each other.

Cast
 Gardo Versoza as Gino
 Isabel Granada as Perlita
 Derek Dee as Gilbert
 Lovely Rivero as Emma
 Kier Legaspi as Abet
 Ricardo Cepeda as Martin
 Mon Confiado as Sam
 Dindo Arroyo as Benjo
 Brando Navarro as Bugoy
 Sharla Sanchez as Dalia
 Christian Galindo as Jun
 Marees Niña Legson
 Luigi Arnesto
 Mark Christopher Melles

Production
The film was shot in Real, Quezon and Antipolo, Rizal.

Production of the film took over a month sometime in 2000. It was in Halloween of 2001 when it finally released.

References

External links

Full Movie on Regal Entertainment

2001 films
2001 action films
Filipino-language films
Philippine action films
Films directed by Mauro Gia Samonte
Regal Entertainment films